Hambrecht is a surname. Notable people with the surname include:

Bill Hambrecht (born 1935), American investment banker
George Hambrecht (1871–1943), American politician